Silver is a surname. Notable people with the surname include:

Abba Hillel Silver (1893–1963), Lithuanian-American rabbi
Adam Silver (born 1962), American sports executive; NBA commissioner (2014–present)
Annon Lee Silver (1938–1971), Canadian lyric soprano
Benjamin Silver (1810–1894), American politician
Benjamin Silver Jr. (died 1890), American politician
Bernard Silver (1924–1963), an early developer of barcode technology
Eliezer Silver (1882–1968) Lithuanian Orthodox rabbi and American human rights activist
Emily Silver (born 1985), retired American swimmer
George Silver (ca. 1560s–1620s), British swordsman
George Silver (actor) (1916–1984), English actor
George Silver (agriculturalist), Scottish agricultural innovator
Henry Silver (1918–1991), American physician
Henry A. Silver (1826–1885), American politician
Horace Silver (1928–2014), American jazz pianist and composer
Jean Silver (1926–2000), American politician
Jerry Silver, American neuroscientist
Joan Micklin Silver (1935–2020), American film director
Joe Silver (1922–1989), American actor
Joel Silver (born 1952), Jewish-American film producer
John Silver (musician) (born 1950), former second drummer for the rock band Genesis
John Silver (wrestler) (born 1991), American professional wrestler
Joseph Silver (1868–1918), South African criminal
Josh Silver (born 1962), keyboardist and producer for the band Type O Negative
Joshua Silver, British scientist
Leon Silver (born 1925), American geologist, professor of Geology at Caltech and instructor to Apollo astronaut crews 
Liberty Silver (b.1961/2), Canadian singer
Lou Silver (born 1953), American-Israeli basketball player
Matthew Silver, Israeli historian
Michael Silver (disambiguation), multiple people
Monroe Silver (1875–1947), American dialect-comedian.
Nate Silver (born 1978), sports and political journalist, founder of FiveThirtyEight.com
Paul Silver (1948–2009), American seismologist
Philip Silver (1909–1999), American philatelist
Ron Silver (1946–2009), American actor
Sheldon Silver (1944-2022), American politician, speaker of the New York State Assembly
Spencer Silver (1941–2021), American chemist and inventor
Stephen Silver (born 1972), animator and cartoonist
Stephen William Silver (1819–1905), merchant and book collector, son of Stephen Winckworth Silver
Stephen Winckworth Silver (1790–1855), clothier and outfitter
Steven Silver (actor) (born 1989), American actor 
Steven Silver (film director), film director
Steven H Silver (born 1967), science fiction editor and publisher
Susan Silver (born 1958), American music manager
Thomas B. Silver (1947–2001), American author and president of the Claremont Institute
Warren Silver (born 1948), American lawyer and state supreme court justice in Maine

Fictional characters
Terry Silver, a character in 1989 American martial arts drama movie The Karate Kid Part III and television series Cobra Kai.
Long John Silver, the main antagonist in the novel Treasure Island (1883) by Robert Louis Stevenson

See also
Silvers (disambiguation)

Surnames of English origin
Jewish surnames
Surnames of Scottish origin